Iron powder has several uses; for example production of magnetic alloys and certain types of steels.

Iron powder is formed as a whole from several other iron particles. The particle sizes vary anywhere from 20-200 μm. The iron properties differ depending on the production method and history of a specific iron powder. There are three types of iron powder classifications: reduced iron powder, atomized powder, and electrolytic iron powder. Each type is used in various applications depending on their properties. There is very little difference in the visual appearances of reduced iron powder and atomized iron powder.

Applications

Automobiles
Most iron powders are used for automobile parts.

Engine parts
Cam shaft pulley
Cam shaft sprocket
Crank shaft pulley
Crank shaft sprocket
Cap crank bearing
Valve guide
Valve seat
Rocker arm chip
Oil pump inner rotor
Oil pump outer rotor

Steering parts, suspension, and brake parts
Power steering rotor cam ring
Pressure plate
Rack guide
Shock absorber
Ball joint 
ABS sensor

Seats and door parts
Seat lifter cam set
Door mirror plate clutch
Striker
Slider

Transmission parts
M/T	Synchronizer hub		
A/T	Hub clutch
Synchronizer ring	 	
Retaining plate
Synchronizer key	 	
Pressure plate
Shift fork	 	
Turbine hub
Weight governor
Cam stater T. C.
Outer race

Other
Iron powder is also used for the following:
Bearings and filter parts 
Machine parts
Hand Warmers 
High strength/wear-resistant parts
Magnetic materials
Friction parts (mainly automobile parts)
 As a fuel
 Oxygen scavengers

External links

See also
 Metal powder

References

Iron
Iron objects
Powders